Oak Park Township may refer to the following townships in the United States:

 Oak Park Township, Cook County, Illinois
 Oak Park Township, Marshall County, Minnesota